Hypselodoris nigrostriata is a species of sea slug or dorid nudibranch, a marine gastropod mollusk in the family Chromodorididae.

Distribution
This nudibranch is found in the Western Indian Ocean, from Tanzania to the Red Sea.

Description
Hypselodoris nigrostriata has a yellow body with black striated lines running all over the body and upper dorsum. The gills and rhinophores are orange-red. This species can reach a total length of at least 40 mm and feeds on blue sponges from the genus Dysidea. It has a similar colour pattern to Hypselodoris zephyra from the western Indo-Pacific Ocean.

References

Chromodorididae
Gastropods described in 1904